Alfred Chilton Pearson, FBA (8 October 1861 – 2 January 1935) was an English classical scholar, noted for his work on Greek tragedy.

Life
After education at King's College School and Highgate School Pearson went up to Christ's College, Cambridge to read classics where he graduated in 1883. After practising briefly as a barrister Pearson spent ten years (1890–1900) as a schoolmaster before entering his late father's business. During this period he produced school editions of Greek tragedies, including some of the plays of Sophocles, culminating in 1917 with his magnum opus, an edition of the Fragments of Sophocles, a work left unfinished on his death by Sir Richard Claverhouse Jebb.

At the age of 58, and despite a life spent outside academia, Pearson was elected in 1919 as the Gladstone Professor of Greek at the University of Liverpool, subsequently becoming in 1921 the Regius Professor of Greek at the University of Cambridge and a fellow of Trinity College.

In 1924, the year of his election as a Fellow of the British Academy, Pearson published his edition of the works of Sophocles in the Oxford Classical Texts series, which remained in print until superseded in 1990 by the edition of Hugh Lloyd-Jones and N.G.Wilson.

Publications
 The Fragments of Zeno and Cleanthes: With Introduction and Explanatory Notes, A. C. Pearson, ed., London: C. J. Clay and Sons and Cambridge University Press: 1891 (The Pitt Press Series). "An essay which obtained the Hare Prize in 1891."
 The Helena of Euripides, edited by A. C. Pearson, Cambridge University Press: 1903 (The Pitt Press Series)
 Euripides: The Heraclidae, edited by A. C. Pearson, Cambridge University Press: 1903 (The Pitt Press Series)
 Euripides: The Phoenissae, edited by A. C. Pearson, Cambridge University Press: 1909 (The Pitt Press Series)
 The Ajax of Sophocles, edited by A. C. Pearson based on the edition of R. C. Jebb, Cambridge University Press, 1912
 Fragments of Sophocles – Edited With Additional Notes From the Papers of Sir R. C. Jebb and W. G. Headlam, 3 volumes, Cambridge University Press, 1917 
 Sophoclis Fabulae recognovit brevique adnotatione critica instruxit A.C. Pearson – Oxford Classical Text, Clarendon Press, 1924

Notes

References
George Chatterton Richards: Alfred Chilton Pearson. A Memoir. London 1935.

1861 births
1935 deaths
People educated at King's College School, London
People educated at Highgate School
Alumni of Christ's College, Cambridge
English classical scholars
Fellows of Trinity College, Cambridge
Fellows of the British Academy
Members of Lincoln's Inn
English barristers
Members of the University of Cambridge faculty of classics
Classical scholars of the University of Liverpool
Regius Professors of Greek (Cambridge)